Musgrave Heighington (c.1680 – 1764) was an English organist and composer.

Background

Musgrave was the son of Ambrose Heighington of White Hurworth, Durham, and of his wife, who was one of the four daughters of Sir Edward Musgrave, first baronet, of Hayton Castle, Cumberland.

He spent time in Dublin between 1725 and 1728.

He held positions as organist in Hull, Bridlington, Great Yarmouth, Leicester and Dundee, and was involved in local musical societies.

Appointments

Organist of Holy Trinity Church, Hull 1717 – 1720
Organist at Bridlington 
Organist of Great Yarmouth Minster 1733 – 1746
Organist of St. Martin's Church, Leicester 1746 - ????
Organist at the Episcopal Chapel, Dundee 1756 - 1764

Compositions
Anniversary ode for the Spalding Society. 
Six Select Odes of Anacreon in Greek and Six of Horace in Latin 
Several songs

References

1680 births
1764 deaths
English organists
British male organists
English composers
People from Durham, England